Glacial erratic boulders in Island County are a remnant of the Pleistocene glaciation that created Puget Sound and transformed the surfaces of what are now Island County's main landmasses: Whidbey Island and Camano Island. South of Deception Pass, the two islands' surfaces and beaches are completely composed of glacial till. Abundant glacial erratic boulders lie on the islands, their beaches, and under the near-shore waters.

List of boulders

References

Sources

 Island County
Landforms of Island County, Washington